Canyon View Preparatory Academy is a public charter high school in the town of Prescott Valley, Arizona. It opened in August 2011 in a new  facility. It is operated by Westwind Children's Services dba Westwind Community Schools which operates Westwind Preparatory Academy in Phoenix and the Park View Middle School in Prescott Valley. It is a member of the Canyon Athletic Association. There are currently 140 students enrolled, with a total projected enrollment in five years of 400. Canyon View received AdvancEd accreditation in November 2013.

References

External links
 Official website

Public high schools in Arizona
Schools in Yavapai County, Arizona
Charter schools in Arizona